Julian Luis "Kiki" DeAyala (born October 23, 1961 in Miami, Florida) is a former American football linebacker in the United States Football League and the National Football League. He was drafted by the Cincinnati Bengals in the sixth round of the 1983 NFL Draft, but first played for the USFL's Houston Gamblers. He played college football for the Texas Longhorns. He graduated from Memorial High School in Houston, Texas.

DeAyala holds six Texas Longhorns records including career sacks with 40.5 and sacks in a season with 22.5.

Personal
DeAyala currently owns a real estate development company in Houston/Rockport, Texas, known as DeAyala Properties.

References

External links
Houston Gamblers bio
DeAyalas real estate company

1961 births
Living people
American football linebackers
American football defensive ends
Texas Longhorns football players
Houston Gamblers players
Cincinnati Bengals players
Players of American football from Miami
Memorial High School (Hedwig Village, Texas) alumni